Kenth Ohlsson is a retired Swedish professional darts player.

Darts career
Ohlsson made one BDO World Darts Championship appearance in 1978 losing 3–6 to fellow Swede Stefan Lord.

World Championship Results

BDO
 1978: 1st round (lost to Stefan Lord 3–6) (legs)

External links
Profile at Darts Database

Swedish darts players
British Darts Organisation players
Living people
Year of birth missing (living people)